Kevin Janssens may refer to:

 Kevin Janssens (footballer), Belgian football player
 Kevin Janssens (actor), Belgian actor